Figueira is a closed halt on the Algarve line in the Portimão municipality, Portugal. It was opened on the 1st of November 1954, having been designed for the CP Class 0100 railbuses.

References

Railway stations in Portugal
Railway stations opened in 1954